Sarah Mercer (born 30 December 1974) is a British gymnast. She competed at the 1992 Summer Olympics.

References

External links
 

1974 births
Living people
British female artistic gymnasts
Olympic gymnasts of Great Britain
Gymnasts at the 1992 Summer Olympics
Sportspeople from Durban